Late For School is an Australian television comedy series which screened for a single season on Network Ten in 1992.

The series is centred around Kathy Price, who returns to study at the school where she was educated sixteen years previously. This provides much embarrassment to her two teenage children who attend the school. The series is notable for introducing a number of young actors who went on to have success in other Australian television series such as Melissa Thomas, Matthew Newton, Stephen Curry, Anthony Engelman and Scott Major.

The series was produced by John Holmes, directed by Tina Butler and Riccardo Pellizzeri and written by Rob Menzies and Rob Caldwell.

Cast
 Sarah Chadwick as Kathy Price
 Ross Higgins as Stan Price
 Melissa Thomas as Lily Price
 Matthew Newton as Dennis Price
 Frankie J. Holden as Principal S. Lavery
 Harry Cripps as Mr. Dicks
 Anne Phelan as Mrs. Dicks
 Stephen Curry as Tim Hickey
 Anthony Engelman as Sefton
 Scott Major as Oates

References

External links

Late For School at Australian Television

1992 Australian television series debuts
1992 Australian television series endings
Network 10 original programming
Australian comedy television series